The 1954–55 Scottish League Cup was the ninth season of Scotland's second football knockout competition. The competition was won by Heart of Midlothian, who defeated Motherwell in the Final.

First round

Group 1

Group 2

Group 3

Group 4

Group 5

Group 6

Group 7

Group 8

Quarter-finals

First Leg

Second Leg

Semi-finals

Final

References

General

Specific

1954–55 in Scottish football
Scottish League Cup seasons